Static cling is the tendency for light objects to stick (cling) to other objects owing to static electricity.  It is common in clothing, but occurs with other items, such as the tendency of dust to be attracted to, and stick to, plastic items.

Cause and prevention
In clothing, static cling occurs from static electricity.  An electrostatic charge builds up on clothes due to the triboelectric effect when pieces of fabric rub against each other, as happens particularly in a clothes dryer.  The separate positive and negatively charged surfaces attract each other.  It is especially noticeable when humidity is low, allowing static electricity to build up.  Certain substances can reduce static cling and are often included in fabric softener and dryer sheets.  Antistatic agents, which make the surfaces slightly conductive, can be used on fabrics.

Electronic devices

Dust accumulation caused by static cling is a significant issue for computers and other electronic devices with heat generating components that need to be cooled by airflow. Dust is carried into the computer by the airflow created by case- and component fans. The accumulated dust covers metal surfaces and clogs the empty space between the fins of heatsinks, diminishing the dissipation of heat and interrupting the outward flow of warm air. Especially for critical components such as microprocessors and memory banks, this raises the risk of them overheating which can ultimately damage or destroy them. To compensate, automatically controlled fans will raise their speed, generating more noise and shortening their lifespan. An additional risk is the (small) electrical conductivity of dust which, given enough accumulation of dust, can cause critical damage to the device's internal components. Dust accumulation grows exponentially, since the accumulated dust creates new static surfaces and physical blockades for new dust to cling to.

In advertising
Advertisers in urban areas, eager to use guerilla marketing techniques, have turned to static cling as a distribution medium. In an advertising campaign for Microsoft's MSN 8 Internet service, on October 24, 2002, hundreds of decals of the MSN butterfly logo were affixed to surfaces in New York City and the New York Times reported that it was static cling that held them there,  however it's more likely that the decals used are of the type held by surface tension against smooth surfaces like glass windows.

References

See also
Electrostatics

Home
Electrostatics